The Bishops' Conference of Scotland (BCOS), under the trust of the Catholic National Endowment Trust, and based in Airdrie, North Lanarkshire, is an episcopal conference for archbishops and bishops of the Roman Catholic Church in Scotland. The conference is primarily made up of the presiding bishops of Scotland's eight dioceses as well as bishops who have retired.

, the president of the conference is Bishop Hugh Gilbert of the Roman Catholic Diocese of Aberdeen.

Agencies
The BCOS is organised into several agencies. These are: The Commission for Doctrine and Unity, The Communications and Press and Media Relations Office, The Commission for Catholic Education and Scottish Catholic Education Service, The Justice and Peace Commission, operating using the name Justice and Peace Scotland, The Heritage Commission as well as some other offices.

The Conference is also a member of several international organisations including the Council of European Bishops' Conferences and the Commission of the Bishops' Conferences of the European Community.

Before 1980, the organisation first registered with Office of the Scottish Charity Regulator and stated that its objective was to "promote, establish, develop, expand, contribute to, support and maintain facilities, projects, schemes and institutions of all kinds having a religious, educational or charitable purpose for the benefit of the community throughout Scotland; and in addition for the benefit of students for the priesthood at home and abroad including the maintenance of the following colleges, all now closed; (a) St. Mary's College, Blairs, Aberdeen, Aberdeenshire; (b) St. Peter's College, Cardross, Dumbarton; (c) St. Andrew's College, Drygrange, Melrose, Roxburghshire."

Ecumenical relations
The Roman Catholic Church in Scotland is a full member of Action of Churches Together in Scotland. The BCOS sends a representative to the Ecumenical Relations Committee of the Church of Scotland and is always invited to send a delegate to the General Assembly of the Church of Scotland.

Member bishops

Archdiocese of Saint Andrews and Edinburgh
Archbishop Leo Cushley
Archdiocese of Glasgow
Archbishop William Nolan
Diocese of Motherwell
Bishop Joseph Toal
Diocese of Paisley
Bishop John Keenan
Diocese of Galloway 
Bishop Emeritus Maurice Taylor
Diocese of Argyll and the Isles
Bishop Brian McGee
Diocese of Aberdeen
Bishop Hugh Gilbert
Bishop Emeritus Peter Moran
Diocese of Dunkeld
Bishop Emeritus Stephen Robson

See also
Roman Catholic Church in Scotland
Religion in Scotland
Catholic Bishops' Conference of England and Wales
 Scottish Catholic International Aid Fund
 Catholic Church Insurance Association

References

External links
Official website 
Bishops' Conference of Scotland webpage. GCatholic.org website

Scotland
Bishops' Conference
Organisations based in North Lanarkshire
Airdrie, North Lanarkshire
Christian organisations based in Scotland
1878 establishments in Scotland
1878 in Christianity
Religious organizations established in 1878